Romer Zane Grey (October 1, 1909 – March 8, 1976) was the eldest son of novelist Zane Grey  He wrote Western novels and books on fishing. Grey was also a scenario writer for Paramount Pictures, plus he was a producer in charge of making movies based on his father’s novels.

Early life

Grey was born in Manhattan, New York, on October 1, 1909, the son of Lina "Dolly" Roth Grey. and Zane Grey. He had a brother and sister.

He attended the Pasadena Military Academy, and when he was eleven he and 15 of his classmates spent five weeks hiking the High Sierras.

Writing career 
Grey attended the University at Westwood, but left before graduation to begin writing. In 1929, when he was 20 years old, he wrote The Cruise of the Fisherman on his father's yacht, The Fisherman. In 1930 it was reported he was writing a travel book for boys about a recent trip to the South Seas islands. 

Much of his work was connected to his father’s books and projects. He helped his father gather material for Zane Grey books, and Grey is credited as the author of the Big Little Books based on the Zane Grey’s King of the Royal Mounted newspaper comic. After his father’s death Grey would write new stories about characters from his father’s novels, including Buck Duane and Laramie Nelson.

Animation 
In 1930, when Grey was 21, he rented a studio in Hollywood and hired a staff of animators to make cartoons about Binko the Bear-Cub, but the endeavor was not successful.

Movie and television work  
In 1935 Grey was signed as a writer for Paramount Pictures, and in October of that year it was reported he was adapting two of his father’s novels for the movie studio. In 1937 he was producing short movie theater films that featured his father trout fishing. In 1955 Romer Grey, his brother Loren, and Hal Hudson created Zane Grey Productions, Inc. to produce television shows based on his father’s books.

Personal life 
Grey married Dorothy Olson on April 12, 1930, at an Episcopal church in Las Vegas. It was a double wedding with Lionel Bernard, Jr. (friend of Grey) and Jean Read (friend of the bride) also marrying. The two couples left for a double honeymoon trip to "points of interest in Utah and Arizona" before the Greys and the Bands returned to Pasadena, where they would be living.

In 1934 Dorothy Grey filed for divorce, charging that Grey "failed to manifest interest in making a home for her." The couple had been separated since November 1, 1932. Mrs. Grey sought custody of their 21-month-old son Romer Zane Grey, Jr. The divorce was granted September 14, 1934. Mrs. Grey was given custody of their son, and Romer Grey was ordered to pay $50 a month in support.

On October 19, 1935, Grey eloped with his father’s secretary, Wilma Morris. In June 1939, when Wilma Grey went to court on a drunk driving charge, it was reported that "$500 bail was posted by her estranged husband Romer Grey."

When Grey died in 1976 he was married to Octave "Bee" Grey. She died in 1985.

Later life and death 
Grey’s brother, Loren, stated that Romer died an alcoholic from working as a writer in the shadow of his famous father.

Romer Grey died on March 8, 1976, at Huntington Memorial Hospital in Pasadena, California from complications following pneumonia. He was 66. Grey was survived by his widow, brother and sister, his son, and five grandchildren.

Bibliography

Fiction 

 Last Stand at Indigo Flats
 The Rider of Distant Trails
 Gun Trouble in Tonto Basin
 High Valley River
 King of the Range
 Siege at Forlorn River
 Three Deaths for Buck Duane
 King of the Outlaw Horde
 The Lawless Land
 Buck Duane: King of the Range
 The Other Side of the Canyon
 Beyond the Mogollon Rim
 Buck Duane: Rider of Distant Trails
 Nevada Jim Lacy: Beyond the Mongolian Rim
 Yacqui: Siege at Forlorn River

Nonfiction 

 The Cruise of The "Fisherman"

 The "Fisherman" Under the Southern Cross

References

External links
 
 

1909 births
1976 deaths
20th-century American novelists
American comics writers
American film producers
American male novelists
Angling writers
Western (genre) writers
20th-century American businesspeople
20th-century American male writers